Eason Ramson (born April 30, 1956) is a former American football tight end in the National Football League (NFL). He played for the St. Louis Cardinals, the San Francisco 49ers, Denver Broncos and the Buffalo Bills.

During his career, he won a Super Bowl with the 49ers and was also the last player in the team's history to wear number 80 before Jerry Rice.

A Sports Illustrated Beta Vault article by Chuck Barney recounts Ramson turning his life around after bouts with cocaine and the California corrections department.

He is now a motivational speaker, and is listed as a 2009 director at the Bayview YMCA  in the southeast corridor of San Francisco and a Director for the C.A.R.E. Program.

References 

1956 births
Living people
Players of American football from Sacramento, California
American football tight ends
Washington State Cougars football players
St. Louis Cardinals (football) players
San Francisco 49ers players
Buffalo Bills players